Coleophora cousiniae is a moth of the family Coleophoridae.

The larvae feed on Cousinia albiflora. They feed on the leaves of their host plant.

References

cousiniae
Moths described in 1988